The Rome Metropolitan Statistical Area in the U.S. state of Georgia, as defined by the United States Census Bureau, is an area consisting of one county – Floyd – in Northwest Georgia. As of the 2000 census, the MSA had a population of 90,565 (though a July 1, 2009 estimate placed the population at 96,250).

Counties
Floyd

Communities

Incorporated places
City of Cave Spring
City of Rome (Principal city)

Census-designated places
Note: All census-designated places are unincorporated.
Lindale
Shannon

Unincorporated places
Livingston
Mount Berry
Silver Creek

See also
Georgia census statistical areas

References

Geography of Floyd County, Georgia
Metropolitan areas of Georgia (U.S. state)
Regions of Georgia (U.S. state)